Tomorrow may refer to:

 Tomorrow (time), the day after today
 The future, that which occurs after the present

Periodicals
 To-Morrow (Chicago magazine), a magazine from 1903 to 1909
 Tomorrow (New Zealand magazine), a left-wing magazine from 1934 to 1940
 Tomorrow (New York magazine), a parapsychology magazine from 1941 to the 1960s
 Tomorrow Speculative Fiction, a magazine
 Studies in Comparative Religion, originally Tomorrow, an academic journal

Television
 The Tomorrow Show, an American late night talk show also known as Tomorrow with Tom Snyder
 Tomorrow (Taiwanese TV series), a 2002 drama series
 Tomorrow (South Korean TV series), a 2022 drama series

Episodes
 "Tomorrow" (Angel), a 2002 season 3 episode of Angel
 "Tomorrow" (Law & Order: Criminal Intent), a 2002 episode of Law & Order: Criminal Intent
 "Tomorrow" (The West Wing), a 2006 episode of The West Wing and the series finale
 "Tomorrow", an episode of Animalia
 "Tomorrow", an episode of First Wave
 "Tomorrow", an episode of Identity

Film
 Tomorrow, a 1952 Chinese film directed by Doe Ching
 Tomorrow (1969 film), a South Korean film of 1969
 Tomorrow (1972 film), an American film directed by Joseph Anthony
 Tomorrow (1988 film), a Japanese film directed by Kazuo Kuroki
 Tomorrow (1995 film), a Hong Kong film starring Tony Leung Chiu-wai
 Tomorrow (2001 film), an Italian film directed by Francesca Archibugi
 Tomorrow (2012 film), a Russian film shown at the 2012 Stockholm International Film Festival
 Tomorrow (2015 film), a French documentary film (Demain) directed by Cyril Dion and Mélanie Laurent
 Tomorrow (2018 film), a British film directed by Martha Pinson
 Tomorrow (2019 film), a Bangladeshi animated short film directed by Mohammad Shihab Uddin

Literature
 Tomorrow (novel), a novel by Graham Swift
 Tomorrow series, a series of novels by John Marsden
 Tom Tomorrow, the pen name of American editorial cartoonist Dan Perkins
 T. O. Morrow, a fictional supervillain in the DC universe
 Tomorrow, a play by Robert Drouet

Music

Performers
 Tomorrow (band), a 1960s British psychedelic rock group

Albums
 Tomorrow (C-Murder album), 2010
 Tomorrow (Elva Hsiao album), 2001
 Tomorrow (Hugh Masekela album), 1987 
 Tomorrow (SR-71 album), 2002
 Tomorrow (Sean Kingston album), 2009
 Tomorrow (Tomorrow album), 1968
 Tomorrow (TVXQ album), 2018
 Tomorrow, by The Winans, and the title song, 1984
 Tomorrow, an EP by Oh Hiroshima, 2010

Songs
 "Tomorrow" (Amanda Lear song), 1977
 "Tomorrow" (Chris Young song), 2011
 "Tomorrow" (Gianluca Bezzina song), 2013
 "Tomorrow" (GloRilla song), 2022
 "Tomorrow" (Kiss song), 1980
 "Tomorrow" (Lillix song), 2003
 "Tomorrow" (Morrissey song), 1992
 "Tomorrow" (Silverchair song), 1994
 "Tomorrow" (Sixx:A.M. song), 2008
 "Tomorrow" (song from Annie), from the musical Annie, 1977
 "Tomorrow" (SR-71 song), 2002
 "Tomorrow" (Strawbs song), 1972
 "Tomorrow (A Better You, Better Me)", by The Brothers Johnson (1976), also covered by Quincy Jones with Tevin Campbell (1990)
 "Tomorrow (Give in to the Night)", by Dimitri Vegas & Like Mike, Dada Life, and Tara McDonald, 2010
 "Tomorrow (Is Another Day)", by Marc Mysterio featuring Samantha Fox, 2009
 "Tomorrow (Voulez-vous un rendez-vous)", by CCCP Fedeli alla linea, 1988
 "Tomorrow", by Amy Grant from Straight Ahead
 "Tomorrow", by Avril Lavigne from Let Go
 "Tomorrow", by Bad Religion from Generator
 "Tomorrow", by Beverley Knight from Prodigal Sista
 "Tomorrow", by Brandy Norwood from Never Say Never
 "Tomorrow", by Brotherhood of Man from Singing a Song
 "Tomorrow", by BTS from "Skool Luv Affair"
 "Tomorrow", by The Cardigans from Life
 "Tomorrow", by Clinic from Do It!
 "Tomorrow", by The Communards
 "Tomorrow", by Cosmic Gate
 "Tomorrow", by The Cranberries from Roses
 "Tomorrow", by Crystal Lewis from Gold
 "Tomorrow", by England Dan & John Ford Coley from Fables
 "Tomorrow", by Europe from Out of This World
 "Tomorrow", by Gorky Park from Moscow Calling
 "Tomorrow", by Information Society from self-titled album
 "Tomorrow", by James from Whiplash
 "Tomorrow", by Joe Walsh from But Seriously, Folks...
 "Tomorrow", by John Legend from Love in the Future
 "Tomorrow", by Jorja Smith from Lost and Found
 "Tomorrow", by Ladytron from Velocifero
 "Tomorrow" ("Yfory"), by Mary Hopkin from Y Caneuon Cynnar (The Early Recordings)
 "Tomorrow", by MIKA from My Name is Michael Holbrook
 "Tomorrow", by Mikuni Shimokawa
 "Tomorrow", by Naomi Shemer
 "Tomorrow", by Out of Eden from No Turning Back
 "Tomorrow", by Ozzy Osbourne from Ozzmosis
 "Tomorrow", by Paul McCartney & Wings from Wild Life
 "Tomorrow", by Pedro Javier González from Guitarra Vol. 3: Tribute to the Beatles
 "Tomorrow", by Public Service Broadcasting from The Race for Space
 "Tomorrow", by Rocko from Self Made
 "Tomorrow", by Ryan Adams from Demolition
 "Tomorrow", by Sandie Shaw
 "Tomorrow", by Stone Temple Pilots with Chester Bennington from High Rise
 "Tomorrow", by Strawberry Alarm Clock from Wake Up...It's Tomorrow
 "Tomorrow", by Thievery Corporation from The Mirror Conspiracy
 "Tomorrow", by Tinchy Stryder from Third Strike
 "Tomorrow", by U2 from October
 "Tomorrow", by Wall of Voodoo from Call of the West
 "To Morrow", written by Bob Gibson, covered by The Kingston Trio from String Along
 "Tomorrow", from the musical Bugsy Malone
 "Tomorrow", by Brittany Howard from the album Jaime

Other uses
 Tomorrow River, a river in the U.S. state of Wisconsin

See also
 "Tomorrow Never Knows", a 1966 song by The Beatles
 "Tomorrow Tomorrow" (Bee Gees song), 1969
 "Tomorrow Tomorrow", a song by Elliott Smith from XO
 Tomorrow and tomorrow and tomorrow
 "Tomorrow's (Just Another Day)", a 1983 song by Madness
 Tomorrowland (disambiguation)
 Toomorrow (disambiguation)
 Future (disambiguation)
 Today (disambiguation)
 Yesterday (disambiguation)